This is a list of Eastern Kentucky Colonels in the NFL Draft.

Key

Selections

References

Eastern Kentucky

Eastern Kentucky Colonels NFL Draft